Richard James Boyages (born March 15, 1962) is Associate Commissioner for Men's Basketball for the annual Big Ten Conference. Working with Big Ten Commissioner James E. Delaney, Boyages serves as main administrator and conference office liaison for the Big Ten Conference men's basketball tournament and primary overseer of the men's basketball officiating program.

Prior to this, Boyages was head coach and association commissioner for the Mid-American Conference (MAC), which he joined in 2005 after stints as special assistant to the athletic director at Ohio State University in its 2004–05 academic year, and as head coach for the William & Mary Tribe men's basketball team from 2000 to 2003. He compiled a 33–52 overall record (21–31 in the CAA) during his three seasons as William & Mary's coach.

Boyages started his coaching career at Bates College in Lewiston, Maine, where he coached for four seasons. In 1987, he became Bates' head basketball coach at age 24, the nation's youngest collegiate head coach that year. His Division I career began at Boston College in 1991, however, following his years at Bates. He also spent two separate stints as an assistant coach for the Ohio State men's team (1998–2000 and 2003–2004).

A native of Wakefield, Massachusetts, Boyages is a 1985 graduate of Bowdoin College in Brunswick, Maine, where he was a studio art major and a basketball team captain. At his graduation he received the college's Allison Haldane Cup for outstanding leadership and character. He earned a master's degree in education from Boston University and was inducted into the New England Basketball Hall of Fame in Glastonbury, Connecticut, in 2009.

References

1962 births
Living people
American men's basketball coaches
American men's basketball players
Basketball coaches from Massachusetts
Basketball players from Massachusetts
Babson Beavers men's basketball coaches
Bates Bobcats men's basketball coaches
Boston College Eagles men's basketball coaches
Boston University School of Education alumni
Bowdoin Polar Bears men's basketball players
Ohio State Buckeyes men's basketball coaches
People from Wakefield, Massachusetts
Sportspeople from Middlesex County, Massachusetts
William & Mary Tribe men's basketball coaches